Ivo Pauwels (born 1950) is a Flemish author.

Biography 

For 20 years, Pauwels was a teacher and began to write articles and columns about gardening in newspapers and magazines. His career as a writer grew significantly, and since 1995 he has written over 60 books on various topics including gardening, antiques, quilts, plants, fines herbes, colours, composting, diabetes mellitus (an illness from which he suffers), barbecue safety, wooden annexes, and greenhouses, as well as biographies of artists and architects. He has also contributed photographs to several of his own books and the books of other authors. Several of his books have been translated into English, French, German, Japanese and Afrikaans. He also has contributed to poetry and erotica anthologies.

For 15 years Pauwels was chief editor of the magazines Bloemen & Planten and De Tuinen van Eden/Les Jardins d’Eden, and for 10 years a writer and editor for the television programme Groene Vingers on VTM, in which he also sometimes appeared as expert. His garden in Zoersel is open to the public on selected days in May and June.

Pauwels is the gardening advisor of Radio 2. He participates in live broadcasts, during which he answers questions from audience members. He has conducted many lectures, mainly on roses, in several European countries, Thailand, Indonesia, and New Zealand. He finds topics for his books and lectures during his numerous journeys and botanical expeditions.

In 2006, he received in Osaka the World Federation of Rose Societies Literary Award for his book, Louis Lens – De elegantie en de roos, and in the same year the Beervelde Award  for the photography of the book Rozenraad.

References 

Flemish writers
Living people
1950 births